Siljan is a municipality in Telemark in the county of Vestfold og Telemark in Norway. It is part of the traditional region of Grenland.  The administrative centre of the municipality is the village of Siljan.  The parish of Slemdal was established as a municipality on 1 January 1838 (see formannskapsdistrikt).  The name was later changed to Siljan.

The municipality is located northeast of Skien and borders Buskerud county in the north and Vestfold og Telemark county in the east.  There is a forest district on both sides of Skiensvassdraget (Skien river).  The older main road to Skien, Larvik, and Oslo, passes through Siljan.

General information

Name
The municipality (originally the parish) is named after the old Siljan farm (Old Norse: Seljur), since the first church was built there.  The name is (probably) the plural form of selja which means "sallow tree" or "willow".  Prior to 1918, the name of the municipality was Slemdal.

Coat-of-arms
The coat-of-arms is from modern times.  They were granted in 1989.  The arms show three white saw blades on a green background.  It was chosen to represent the timber industry of the  municipality.

Notable people 
 Kristian Norheim (born 1976) a Norwegian politician, municipal councillor in Siljan, 1995 to 1999

References

External links

Municipal fact sheet from Statistics Norway

 
Municipalities of Vestfold og Telemark
Villages in Vestfold og Telemark